John Nash may refer to:

Arts and entertainment
John Nash (architect) (1752–1835), Anglo-Welsh architect
John Nash Round, English architect active in the mid-19th-century Kent
Jolly John Nash (1828–1901), English music hall entertainer
John Nash (artist) (1893–1977), English painter and engraver
Johnny Nash (1940–2020), American singer-songwriter

Politics
John Nash (MP) (1590–1661), English merchant and politician who sat in the House of Commons between 1640 and 1648
John Nash (Australian politician) (1857–1925), New South Wales politician
John Nash, Baron Nash (born 1949), British peer, government minister and businessman
John J. Nash (died 1989), Irish Fianna Fáil politician

Sports
John Nash (footballer) (1867–1939), English footballer
John Nash (cricket administrator) (1906–1977), English secretary of Yorkshire County Cricket Club, 1931–1971
John Nash (basketball), American basketball executive
John Victor Nash (1891–19??), Argentine Olympic bobsledder

Other
John Forbes Nash Jr. (1928–2015), American mathematician and economist, 1994 Nobel in Economics laureate
John Henry Nash (printer) (1871–1947), Canadian-American fine printer and founder of the Twentieth Century Press
John Nash (priest) (1879–?), Archdeacon of Tuam
John Francis Nash (1909–2004), American railroad executive

See also
Jack Nash (disambiguation)
John Naish (1841–1890), lawyer and lord chancellor of Ireland